Rawa or Rao is a group of Minangkabau people who come from Rao, West Sumatra. In the Malay Peninsula, now the West Malaysia, it is common for the Rawa to identify themselves as Ughang Rawo or Ughang Rao or even Rao.

History

The Rawa or Rao people came to Malaysia from Rao and Mapat Tunggul villages, in Pasaman, West Sumatera, Indonesia in 1773 to 1848 to Negeri Sembilan, in 1857 to 1863 to Pahang, in 1867 to 1873 to Selangor, in 1875 to 1876 to Perak and some in Kelantan.

Population

The population spread around Perak, several parts in Penang, Selangor and Pahang. Gopeng, a small town in Perak is a well-known town for its Rawa community who is still preserving most of its tradition and dialect for centuries, way before the formation of Malaysia.

Language
 
Among the most notable suffixes used by the Rawa is kuak, sang, tang. For instance:

 Bak mano tang means "how could that be"
 Ompek ringgit sang means "four ringgit only"
 Nyonyo nak bergolek kuak means "maybe he wants to sleep"
 Oma citen ku means "my butt are hurt"

Other significant phrases such as:

 Bak siko cipier to means "give me the plate"
 Ondeik! Gudang utak bak nyonyo means "owh! stubborn just like him"
 Beserendeng tukong means "carrying things excessively/overloaded"
 Banyak uta kareknyo means "he's mischievous/cunning"
 Lotowk dongen kayu to means "Hit it with the stick"
 Ako ngincah/kincah kain isowk means "i'll rinse the clothes tomorrow"
 Bak kato jako...means "like i just said"
 Aghri Senoyen means "Monday"
 Pukol ompek karang nyo means "its at 4 o'clock"
 Kao idak poie menjongouwk means "will you be going for the funeral?"
 Abeih berkerotang sado alahnyo means "everything is a complete mess" (when the mouth gets messy with foods while eating)
 Hopak! bergayo tang kawo genaghain/genarin means "Wow! you looks stylish nowadays"
 Sempureh kawo! means "to hell with you!" (offensive)
 Ku sipak kang means "i'll kick you" (offensive)
 Abeih tekelayak means "it tears apart" (specifically for open wound)
 Indo ku podah! means "I don't want to!"

Rawa Cuisine
The Kelamai, Gulai Nangko and Asom Iken Koli have become the signature cuisine of the Rawa community in which they mastered every inch of its details and procedures. Many tourist who joined the Gopeng Homestay Program in Gopeng will experiencing these wonderful cuisine. The Kelamai or pronounce as Kelamei is a sweet dark brown delicacy similar to the Lemang. It is cooked for hours inside a specifically chosen bamboo under very tedious supervision. Not to mention the complicated pre cook procedures of preparing the down.

Tradition

Adet Berjojak or Adaik Bajajak (in Standard Minangkabau) is a traditional ritual usually practiced for children. There are very detail protocols and constrains to abide upon completion.

External links
 Susur Galor Melayu Rao
 Seminar Melayu Rao UPSI 25 July 2009
 JARO (Jalinan Anak Rao)

Malaysian people of Malay descent
Malay people
Minangkabau
Ethnic groups in Malaysia
Languages of Malaysia